= Johanna Racer =

Dutch merchant

Johanna Racer (1734–1822), was a Dutch merchant. Between 1764 and 1807, she managed the textile import company Johanna Racer, wed. Tak, which imported textile from India and was known as one of the most successful companies in contemporary Netherlands. She retired in 1807 and left the company to her niece and namesake.
